is a junction railway station in the city of Nikkō, Tochigi, Japan, jointly operated by the private railway operators Yagan Railway and Tobu Railway. The station is numbered "TN-58" in the Tobu Railway system.

Lines

Station layout
Shin-Fujiwara Station has two island platforms serving three tracks, connected to the station building by a level crossing.

Platforms

Adjacent stations

History
It was renamed Shin-Fujiwara on 19 March 1922 at the same time the line was electrified.

From 17 March 2012, station numbering was introduced on all Tobu lines, with Shin-Fujiwara Station becoming "TN-57". It was renumbered "TN-58" on 21 April 2017 ahead of the opening of Tobu World Square Station (TN-55) in July 2017.

Passenger statistics
In fiscal 2019, the Tobu portion of the station was used by an average of 726 passengers daily (boarding passengers only). The Yagen Railway portion of the station was used by 492 passengers daily in fiscal 2016.

Surrounding area
 
 Kinugawa River
 Yagan Railway head office

See also
 List of railway stations in Japan

References

External links

 Tobu Railway station information 
 Yagen Railway station information 

Railway stations in Tochigi Prefecture
Aizu Line
Railway stations in Japan opened in 1919
Tobu Kinugawa Line
Nikkō, Tochigi